Events in the year 1913 in India.

Incumbents
 Emperor of India – George V
 Viceroy of India – Charles Hardinge, 1st Baron Hardinge of Penshurst

Events
 National income - 13,473 million
 3 May- Raja Harischandra, First full-length movie of India released. Beginning of Indian Film Industry.
 6 November – Mohandas Gandhi is arrested while leading a march of Indian miners in South Africa.
 Rabindranath Tagore (1861–1941), Bengali poet, got the Nobel Prize in Literature for his book of lyrics called Gitanjali translated into English by himself.

Law
Official Trustees Act
White Phosphorus Matches Prohibition Act

Births
5 March – Gangubai Hangal, Indian singer of the khyal genre of Hindustani classical music (died July y 25, 2009).
1 May– Balraj Sahni, Indian actor (died 13 April 1973)
Bhagwan Dada, actor and film director (died 2002).
Attia Hosain, writer, feminist and broadcaster (died 1998).
Chandrakant Mandare, actor and artist (died 2001).
 29 march Bhawani Prasad Mishra – a great poet of Hindi
 1 July PP Kumaramangalam, Chief of the Army Staff of Indian Army (08 Jun 1966 to 07 Jun 1969) (died 2000).
 27 July Kalpana Dutta Joshi, Freedom Fighter, Communist Movement in India (died 08 Feb 1995 in Calcutta, India).

Deaths
Devaki Nandan Khatri, first author of mystery novels in Hindi (born 1861).

References

 
India
Years of the 20th century in India